Rians is a commune in the Cher department in the Centre-Val de Loire region of France.

Geography
An unusual kind of fresh (unpasteurised) cheese, Faisselle Rians, is produced here.

Population

Sights
 The church of St. Christophe, dating from the twelfth century.
 The fifteenth-century chateau of Sery.
 The two watermills of Malvette and Ecorce.

See also
Communes of the Cher department

References

Communes of Cher (department)